The Lempäälä railway station is located in the central urban area of the municipality of Lempäälä. It is located along the Riihimäki–Tampere railway, and its neighboring stations are Tampere in the north and Viiala in the south.

Services 

Lempäälä is served by VR commuter rail line  on the route Helsinki–Riihimäki–Tampere, as well as line  on the route Toijala–Tampere–Nokia. Southbound trains toward Toijala, Riihimäki and Helsinki use track 1, while northbound trains toward Tampere and Nokia use track 3; track 2 lacks a platform and is only used by trains passing through the station.

References 

Lempäälä
Railway stations in Pirkanmaa